The Recruiter Badge is a decoration of the United States uniformed services that is awarded to personnel who have performed recruitment duties as service recruiters. The Recruiter Badge is issued by every branch of the U.S. uniform services except for the Marine Corps and the NOAA Commissioned Corps. With the exception of the U.S. Army, a Recruiting Service Ribbon is also awarded to those personnel who have completed successful tours as recruiters.

U.S. Army

U.S. Army recruiter badges are presented to active and reserve Army personnel who are assigned to the U.S. Army Recruiting Command (USAREC). The Basic Recruiter Identification Badge is a silver crest that incorporates an eagle with raised wings straddling a flaming torch surrounded by a green banner with the words "U.S. Army Recruiter."  Army Recruiters can compete for the Gold Recruiter Badge which is a gold variant of the Basic Recruiter Identification Badge and work towards qualifying for the Master Recruiter Badge.

All Army personnel that graduate from the Army Recruiter Course (ARC) or are assigned to USAREC are authorized to wear the Basic Recruiter Identification Badge.  However, only those ARC graduates who have satisfied specific recruiting goals are authorized to wear the Basic Recruiter Identification Badge as a permanent award.  The Gold Recruiter Badge is awarded when a recruiter has achieved 2,400 production points while assigned as a recruiter.  The Master Recruiter Badge is earned in the same manner as the Army's Expert Infantryman Badge, Expert Field Medical Badge, and Expert Soldier Badge whereby the recruiter must pass a series of tests and recruiting requirements in additional to holding the rank of a non-commissioned officer, warrant officer, or officer.

Prior to the establishment of the Master Recruiter Badge in September 2011, Army Recruiters could earn up to three gold achievement stars for their Basic Recruiter Identification Badge, the Gold Recruiter Badge with up to three sapphire achievement stars, the Army Recruiter Ring, and the Glenn E. Morrell Medallion, respectively, as symbols of successive achievements in recruiting.

Starting in World War II, the Reserve Recruiter Identification Badge was also an identification badge of the U.S. Army until June 2001 when the U.S. Army declared the award discontinued in favor of the standard Recruiter Badge used by both active duty and reserve recruiters.  During the years of its issuance, the Reserve Recruiter Badge was authorized for wear while serving a tour of duty as a military recruiter for the U.S. Army Reserve.  The badge was not considered a permanent award, and was surrendered at the completion of duties as a reserve recruiter.

Due to the stigma that existed with the U.S. Army shortly after the Vietnam War, the Army's Surgeon General requested a unique recruiter badge be authorized for wear by Army medical recruiters to help distinguished them from regular Army recruiters at recruiting events.  In November 1991, the Army Deputy Chief of Staff for Personnel approved the creation of the Army Medical Department Recruiter Identification Badge which was in use until June 2001 when it was replaced by the Army Recruiter Identification Badges.  This badge was authorized for wear in the same manner as the Army Reserve Recruiter Identification Badge.  However, this badge replaced the Distinctive Unit Insignia on the black pull-over sweater when worn by Army medical recruiters.

Recruiters of the Army National Guard (ARNG) wear distinct Army National Guard Recruiting and Retention Badges which depicts the Minuteman in the center of the badge. The Army National Guard Recruiting and Retention Badges are awarded in three degrees (basic, senior, and expert).  The basic badge is unique in its design while the senior and expert badges are similar in appearance with the expert badge displaying the words "Peritus" in a gold arch at the top of the badge.  The senior and expert badges can be modified to reflect specific recruiting awards, specifically the "Master 7" and "Director's 54" awards.  On the senior and expert badges, raised gold numerals "7" or "54" are placed inside the raised hexagon at the top of the badge.

In addition to the modifications that are made to a recruiter's senior or expert badge, those Army National Guard Recruiters that earn the Director's 54 award are also presented a special ring for their recruiting achievement.

On 12 May 2008, the design of the Army National Guard Recruiting and Retention Badges changed to what you see above.  Prior to this change, these badges were simpler in design with a silver (basic), gold (senior), and gold with wreath (master) versions.  As with the new design, these badges incorporated the Minutemen prominently in the center surrounded by the words "ARMY NATIONAL GUARD RECRUITING AND RETENTION."  Previous versions of these badges used to have to words "ARMY NATIONAL GUARD RECRUITER" but remained basically unchanged since their introduction in the mid 1970s.  The master version had a gold scrawl at the bottom of the wreath where the "Master 7" or "Chief's 54" (now known as the Director's 54) awards can be denoted.

According to U.S. Army Pamphlet 670–1, the basic and senior versions of the Army National Guard Recruiting and Retention Badge are temporary badges that must be surrendered upon the completion of a soldier's recruiting assignment.  The expert version of this badge is awarded to National Guard soldiers as a permanent award.  However, Army National Guard Regulation 601-1 states that all three badges are permanent awards that may be worn on the Army uniform regardless of duty station.

U.S. Air Force

The U.S. Air Force's Basic Recruiter Badge is authorized for wear by all personnel who are assigned to active duty Air Force recruiting stations.  The badge is worn as a decoration centered on the left uniform pocket for males and centered on the right side of the uniform above the nameplate for females.  Those recruiters who have completed certification as recruiters earn the Certified Recruiter Badge, which is identical to the Basic Recruiter Badge but has a blue ring that surrounds its perimeter.  Depending on the recruiter's personal achievement, the recruiter can earn a Silver Recruiter Badge (badge surrounded with silver wreath) or Gold Recruiter Badge (badge surrounded with gold wreath), which is the highest award a recruiter can achieve.  Also Air Force recruiters can earn the Senior Recruiter Badge, Master Recruiter Badge, or Command (Cmd) Master Recruiter Badge.  The Senior Recruiter Badge is identical to the Silver Recruiter Badge but has a white star at the top of the wreath with a numerical designation denoting the number of times the senior recruiter has earned a Silver Recruiter Badge.  The Master Recruiter Badge looks similar to the Senior Recruiter Badge but has a distinctive wreath atop the badge with a large three-dimensional (3D) silver nautical star set in a blue background.  The Command Master Recruiter Badge is the same as the Master Recruiter Badge except the large 3D silver nautical star is replaced with a large 3D gold nautical star.

Recruiters earning their fourth silver wreath also earn the U.S. Air Force Silver Recruiter Ring while those earning the gold wreath receive the U.S. Air Force Gold Recruiter Ring.

The U.S. Air Force Recruiting Service Badge is considered a temporary decoration and must be surrendered upon a service member's completion of duty at the specified Recruiting Command.

The U.S. Air Force Reserve Command Recruiting Service Badge is authorized to all personnel who are assigned to Air Force Reserve Command recruiting stations.  The badge is worn as a decoration centered on the left uniform pocket for males and centered on the right side of the uniform above the nameplate for females.  The badge may be modified with a gold rope that incorporates a gold banner at the bottom of the badge that denotes the recruiter's position (Staff, Assistant Senior, Senior, or Medical), referred to as the Staff Badge.  Additionally, the badge may be modified with a gold wreath which incorporates a gold banner atop the badge denoting a recruiter's personal achievement (100, 200, or Master); these badges are called "Century Club Badges."  Staff, Assistant Senior, Senior, or Medical recruiters with century awards have recruiter badges that are modified with a gold wreath that incorporates gold banners at the top and bottom of the badge denoting both achievement and position; these badges are called "Dual Century Club Badges."  Recent official Air Force photographs of Air Force Reserve Command Recruiters wearing the Staff and Dual Century Club Badges have a numerical designation in the bottom banner where the recruiter's position is usually noted.  This numerical designation could be a change in how positions are identified on the recruiter badge; however, no documentation describing this change has been found.

The U.S. Air Force Reserve Recruiting Service Badge is considered a temporary decoration and must be surrendered upon a service member's completion of duty at the specified Recruiting Command.

The U.S. Air National Guard (ANG) Recruiting Service Badge is authorized to all personnel who are assigned to Air National Guard recruiting stations.  The badge is worn as a decoration centered on the left uniform pocket for males and centered on the right side of the uniform above the nameplate for females.  The badge is issued in three degrees; basic, senior, and master.  The senior and master versions of the badge have a star or star with wreath, respectively, which are perched atop of the badge.  There are gold variants of each badge which denote personal awards in recruiting and retention. 
 
The Air National Guard Recruiter Badge is considered a temporary decoration and must be surrendered upon a service member's completion of duty at the specified Recruiting Command.

Since none of these Air Force recruiting badges are permanent awards, the Air Force previously presented their recruiters with the Air Force Recruiting Service Ribbon.  This ribbon became a permanent award once a recruiter had performed six months of good recruiting service.  Additional awards of are denoted with oak leaf clusters.  As of September 2014, the Air Force no longer awards the Recruiting Service Ribbon, and has replaced it with the Air Force Special Duty Ribbon.

U.S. Navy

The U.S. Navy Recruiting Command Badge is worn by all Navy personnel while assigned to duty with the Navy Recruiting Command.  Excellent performance, meeting criteria set by Commanding Officer Navy Recruiting Command, is acknowledged with the addition of a gold metallic wreath, called the "Gold Wreath Award," that surrounds the badge.  Subsequent awards of excellence are denoted with 5/16 inch silver stars at the bottom of the wreath.  Once a recruiter has achieved their 5th award, the silver stars are replaced with a gold star.  Once a recruiter has achieved their 10th award, the wreath is upgraded with a gold scroll that's incorporated into the top of the wreath with the word "Excellence" embossed on the scroll. Subsequent achievements in excellence are denoted with the appropriate silver and/or gold star(s) at the bottom of the wreath.  This progression continues using a large gold star on top of the scroll to signify the 20th award, a large gold star with wreath for the 25th, and two large gold stars and wreaths for the 30th.  Silver and gold stars at the bottom of the wreath are used to signify awards 31 through 39 and four large gold stars, two with wreaths on top of the badge, are used to denote the 40th award.  A Navy recruiter can earn up to 49 consecutive gold wreath awards for achievements in recruiting.

The U.S. Navy Recruiting Command badge is a temporary badge that must be surrendered upon completion of a recruiter's tour of duty as a Navy Recruiter.

Since none of these Navy recruiting badges are permanent awards, the Navy present their recruiters with the Navy Recruiting Service Ribbon.  This ribbon is awarded once a recruiter has performed three years of good recruiting service.  Additional years of good recruiting service are denoted with service stars.  Bronze award numerals, placed near the right edge of the ribbon, are used to denote the number of Gold Wreath Awards earned by the recruiter.

U.S. Coast Guard

The U.S. Coast Guard Recruiting Badge is authorized for wear by those personnel assigned as full-time United States Coast Guard recruiters.  The badge may be upgraded with a gold wreath which is awarded to Guardsmen who have successfully completed Recruiter School and have completed the Personnel Qualification Standard.  The badge is worn on the left pocket of active duty Coast Guard uniforms and is a temporary decoration which must be surrendered upon departure from a Recruiting Command.

The U.S. Coast Guard Academy Admissions Recruiting Badge is authorized for wear by Coast Guard personnel assigned to a Coast Guard Academy Admissions Division billet.  The badge is worn on the left pocket of active duty Coast Guard uniforms and is a temporary decoration which must be surrendered upon reassignment outside of the Academy Admissions Division.

Since none of these Coast Guard recruiting badges are permanent awards, the Coast Guard presents their recruiters with the Coast Guard Recruiting Service Ribbon.  This ribbon is awarded once a recruiter has completed a two years tour as a recruiter.  Additional awards of are denoted by service stars.

U.S. Public Health Service Commissioned Corps

The U.S. Public Health Service Commissioned Corps Recruiter Badges are authorized for wear by those officers assigned as part-time or full-time U.S. Public Health Service Commissioned Corps (PHSCC) recruiters.  There are three levels of PHSCC recruiters; Recruiter, Associate Recruiter Lead, and Associate Recruiter corresponding to two different recruiter badges; the PHSCC Recruiter Badge and the PHSCC Associate Recruiter Badge.  The badges are temporary decorations and must be surrendered upon completion of their recruiting duties.

In an attempt to make full use of the PHSCC existing recruitment resources to obtain candidates for the Corps, the Associate Recruiter Program (ARP) was established to be a volunteer program.  The success of the ARP relies on participation of active-duty officers, inactive reserve officers, retired officers, students, civilians, operating divisions, staff divisions, and other organizations to which Corps officers are assigned.  Although these officers are not required to be a part of the ARP to recruit, enrollment allows the Corps to recognize their efforts.  Once enrolled, an Associate Recruiter is issued a PHSCC Associate Recruiter Badge as a symbol that distinguishes an individual's involvement in recruitment activities for the Corps.

After three consecutive years as either a full-time recruiter or active status as an Associate Recruiter, a USPHSCC officer is eligible to be awarded the Public Health Service Recruitment Service Award.

See also

Military recruitment
Recruiting Service Ribbon
Military badges of the United States
Awards and decorations of the Public Health Service
Obsolete badges of the United States military

References

United States military badges
Military recruitment